The 1989 Fiji rugby union tour of Europe was a series of matches played in October–November 1989 in Europe by Fiji national rugby union team.

Results

References

Note

Fiji
tour
Fiji national rugby union team tours
tour
tour
tour
Rugby union tours of Scotland
Rugby union tours of England
Rugby union tours of France